John Byron Owens (born 1971) is an American judge and lawyer who serves as a United States circuit judge of the United States Court of Appeals for the Ninth Circuit.

Early life and education

Owens was born in Washington, D.C. in 1971, and grew up in Northern California. He is the grandson of Harold Agnew.

Owens graduated from the University of California, Berkeley in 1993 with a Bachelor of Arts with high distinction. While an undergraduate, Owens worked as a marketing assistant for the Golden State Warriors. He then attended Stanford Law School, where he was an editor of the Stanford Law Review. He graduated in 1996 ranked first in his class with a Juris Doctor degree with distinction.

Legal career 
After law school, Owens was a law clerk for Judge J. Clifford Wallace of the United States Court of Appeals for the Ninth Circuit from 1996 to 1997 and for Justice Ruth Bader Ginsburg of the U.S. Supreme Court from 1997 to 1998. Owens then worked as a trial attorney for the United States Department of Justice's Office of Consumer Litigation. From 2000 until 2001, he served as a litigation associate at the law firm O'Melveny & Myers in Washington, D.C. From 2001 until 2004, he served in the U.S. Attorney's Office for the Central District of California as an Assistant United States Attorney. In 2004, he transferred to the U.S. Attorney's Office in the Southern District of California, where he served until 2012, serving first as an Assistant United States Attorney from 2004 until 2008, then as the deputy chief of the major frauds section from 2008 until 2010 and finally as the chief of the criminal division from 2010 until 2011. He has appeared on the television show American Greed.

From January 2012 until April 2014, Owens was a litigation partner in the Los Angeles office of Munger, Tolles & Olson LLP.

Federal judicial service

On August 1, 2013, President Barack Obama nominated Owens to a seat on the United States Court of Appeals for the Ninth Circuit. He filled the seat that was vacated by Judge Stephen S. Trott, who assumed senior status on December 31, 2004. On January 16, 2014 his nomination was reported out of committee to the full Senate by a voice vote. On March 26, 2014, Senate Majority Leader Harry Reid filed for cloture on the nomination. On March 27, 2014, the Senate voted 54–44 to invoke cloture on Owens' nomination. On March 31, 2014, the United States Senate confirmed Owens' nomination by a 56–43 vote. He received his judicial commission on April 2, 2014. Owens was officially seated and sworn in on April 25, 2014.

See also 
 List of law clerks of the Supreme Court of the United States (Seat 6)

References

External links

1971 births
Living people
21st-century American judges
Assistant United States Attorneys
California lawyers
Judges of the United States Court of Appeals for the Ninth Circuit
Law clerks of the Supreme Court of the United States
People associated with Munger, Tolles & Olson
People associated with O'Melveny & Myers
People from Washington, D.C.
The Harker School alumni
Stanford Law School alumni
United States court of appeals judges appointed by Barack Obama
United States Department of Justice lawyers
University of California, Berkeley alumni